Vullnet Xhevat Basha (born 11 July 1990) is a professional footballer who plays as a midfielder for Polish I liga club Wisła Kraków. Born in Switzerland, he represented that nation at youth international levels but played for Albania at senior level.

Club career

Real Zaragoza
On 8 August 2014, Basha joined Segunda División side Real Zaragoza on season-long loan from Sion. The deal included a buyout option.

Ponferradina
On 25 July 2015, Basha joined Ponferradina where he penned a one-year contract. He was presented to the media on the very same day, where he was allocated the squad number 4.

Murcia
On 15 July 2016 Basha signed with UCAM Murcia CF among Jonathan Mejía.

Wisła Kraków
On 10 August 2017 he signed a contract with Wisła Kraków.

International career
Basha represented Switzerland at the 2009 UEFA European Under-19 Football Championship.

On 25 April 2013, Basha declared that he will follow the example of his older brother, Migjen Basha, and play for Albania, since he is liked by coach Gianni de Biasi.

On 24 May 2013, Basha received the Albanian citizenship along with four fellow players Azdren Llullaku, Jurgen Gjasula, Amir Abrashi and Ilir Berisha.

He played in his only match for Albania against Armenia in an international friendly on 14 August 2013, which ended in a 2–0 win at Qemal Stafa Stadium.

References

External links
Career History at ASF

1990 births
Living people
Sportspeople from Lausanne
Kosovo Albanians
Swiss people of Albanian descent
Association football midfielders
Swiss men's footballers
Albanian footballers
Albania international footballers
Switzerland youth international footballers
Switzerland under-21 international footballers
FC Lausanne-Sport players
Grasshopper Club Zürich players
Neuchâtel Xamax FCS players
FC Sion players
Real Zaragoza players
SD Ponferradina players
UCAM Murcia CF players
Wisła Kraków players
Ionikos F.C. players
Segunda División players
Ekstraklasa players
Super League Greece players
Swiss expatriate footballers
Albanian expatriate footballers
Expatriate footballers in Spain
Albanian expatriate sportspeople in Spain
Swiss expatriate sportspeople in Spain
Expatriate footballers in Poland
Albanian expatriate sportspeople in Poland
Swiss expatriate sportspeople in Poland
Expatriate footballers in Greece
Albanian expatriate sportspeople in Greece
Swiss expatriate sportspeople in Greece